Edith Mary Pye (20 October 1876 – 16 December 1965) was an English midwife and International Relief Organizer. She worked in maternity hospitals for women refugees and was the president of the British Midwives Institute. Along with being a member of Friends Germany Emergency Committee, Red Cross, and the International Commission for the Assistance of Child Refugees. In 1907, she became Superintendent of District Nurses in London, following her lengthy career in international relief efforts and as a midwife. She died at her home in Somerset in 1965.

Early life

She was born on 20 October 1876 in London, to William Arthur Pye JP, a wine merchant, and Margaret Thompson Kidston,  daughter of James Burns Kidston of Glasgow. Her siblings included Sybil Pye, the bookbinder, the artist Ethel Pye and David Randall Pye, the scientist and father of the sculptor William Pye. Ethel and Sybil belonged to a circle of friends of Rupert Brooke, known as the Neo-pagans.

Career 

Edith Pye became a registered midwife in 1906 from Clapham School of Midwifery. She became a member of the Society of Friends (Quakers) in 1908 and, with her friend Dr Hilda Clark, a physician and humanitarian aid worker, organized the Friends War Victim Relief in December 1914 at Chalons-sur-Marne. They organized a maternity hospital inside the war zone and helped women and children war victims in France. For these efforts, Pye was awarded the Legion d'honneur. In 1923, she traveled to China to continue relief work in association with the Women's International League. She organized the Friends' work in Spain during the Spanish Civil War and was involved with the International Commission for the Assistance of Child Refugees and the Women's International League for peace and freedom. During World War II, she supported the lifting of the allied blockade in an effort to allow food and medical supplies to be sent to starving people in Europe. She was a leading member of the Famine Relief Committee and she lobbied the Ministry of Economic Warfare. Between 1941 and 1955 she worked in both France and Greece while continuing her efforts for peace and war relief.

Death 
Pye died at her home at 4 Overleigh, Street, Somerset on 16 December 1965. She was buried under the same headstone as Hilda Clark.

References

Bibliography 

  

English midwives
Nurses from London
English humanitarians
1876 births
1965 deaths
Women's International League for Peace and Freedom people